Nello Troggi (26 April 1912 – 21 June 1944) was an Italian racing cyclist. He won stage 1 of the 1937 Giro d'Italia.

References

External links
 

1912 births
1944 deaths
Italian male cyclists
Italian Giro d'Italia stage winners
People from Frosinone
Cyclists from Lazio
Sportspeople from the Province of Frosinone